Nahuel Oviedo Bentancourt (born 9 May 1990) is an Argentine footballer.

In July 2018, Oviedo was arrested for the murder of fellow footballer Facundo Espíndola.

References

External Links
 
 

1990 births
Living people
Argentine footballers
Argentine expatriate footballers
Club Atlético Huracán footballers
Sportivo Italiano footballers
San Antonio Unido footballers
Segunda División Profesional de Chile players
Expatriate footballers in Chile
Association football forwards
People charged with murder
Footballers from Buenos Aires